In enzymology, a maltose-6'-phosphate glucosidase is an enzyme that catalyzes the chemical reaction

maltose 6'-phosphate + H2O  D-glucose + D-glucose 6-phosphate

Thus, the two substrates of this enzyme are maltose-6'-phosphate and H2O, whereas its two products are D-glucose and D-glucose 6-phosphate.

This enzyme belongs to the family of hydrolases, specifically those glycosidases that hydrolyse O- and S-glycosyl compounds.   This enzyme participates in starch and sucrose metabolism.

Nomenclature 

The systematic name of this enzyme class is maltose-6'-phosphate 6-phosphoglucohydrolase. This enzyme is also called phospho-alpha-glucosidase.

Structural studies

As of late 2007, only one structure has been solved for this class of enzymes, with the PDB accession code .

References

 

EC 3.2.1
Enzymes of known structure